Viral Hog (styled ViralHog) is a Montana licensing agency for newsworthy videos shot by the public, typically with smartphones. Established in 2014, the agency enables a monetization stream for licensors of their (possibly) viral phenomena.

References

External links
 Official website
 Rocket Hits Very Close to Woman Near Kyiv National University - ViralHog October 2022 Ukraine War rocket detonation at Kyiv National University

Organizations established in 2014
2014 establishments in the United States
2014 establishments in Montana